Alexander Fort is a fort in Razmak, North Waziristan Agency of the Federally Administered Tribal Areas in Pakistan. The British forces established the fort to control warrior tribes on both sides of the Shora Alqad.

References

Forts in Khyber Pakhtunkhwa